Mariamman Koil, dedicated to the Hindu god Mariamman, is a temple located in Pilakool, near Saidarpalli, the south part of Thalassery, in Kerala, India. The deity in this temple is believed to be formed in its own, around ninety years ago. The temple is maintained by the Shri P P Appu Master and family. Shri P P Appu Master is a teacher by profession and has established a school in Thalassery.

The chief priest of the temple is Shri. Ratnavel, commonly known as Mani Mash (Mani Master). The annual festival of temple commences on the first Tuesday in April every year and lasts for five days. Agnikaragam, Pookaragam, Poomithi, Kurithikuli, Balipooja are the vital features of the annual festival.

The temple follows one of the most traditional pooja forms and is credited to be one of the most sought temples in this region.

See also
 Temples of Kerala

Hindu temples in Kannur district
Mariamman temples
Devi temples in Kerala
Buildings and structures in Thalassery